Dustclouds is the second film by director Filip Jan Rymsza. It serves as a companion to his 2004 film Sandcastles. Dustclouds and Sandcastles travel in a ceaseless loop, forming a diptych titled Sunday Morning Sublime. Each film starts where the other leaves off and can be seen independently or together. Different stories emerge depending on the order in which they're viewed.

Plot

Dustclouds is an epic fever-dream, chronicling a long night's journey into day. As his wedding carriage rides beneath a starlit night, Getz (Wesley Walker) vows to enjoy the fruits of his labor. Having worked his whole life, he has finally married. Yet as he lies in his bride's embrace, Getz already starts to question his happiness. Deep within, he yearns for "the perfect," which puts strain on his marriage. As the night progresses, inner turmoil unravels the fabric of Getz's being. Years begin to pass like seconds. Time, identity and purpose become unstuck. And a great sadness is borne into his life. Getz longs for answers, but is terrified by what he could lose in his search for truth. What follows is a quest deep into his heart of darkness.

Cast
 Irina Björklund —  Karina
 Wesley Walker —  Getz
 Jay Whittaker —  Baal
 Jane Alderman —  Mrs. Casanova
 John Nyrere Frazier —  Farfarello - The Bride of Night
 John Lordan —  Virgil / Cowboy
 Fred Zimmerman —  Ingis Fats
 Dale Rivera —  Soldier
 Jennifer Sydney —  Karina (Grace #2)
 Ainsley Elias —  Karina (Grace #3)
 John Harrell —  Brian Blest
 Audrey Francis —  Prostitute
 Timothy Jon —  Kaon
 Thomas Craven —  Barbariccia
 Ben Dubash —  Wedding Guest
 Michael Erickson —  Young Getz
 Andre Ing —  Malacoda
 Tim Krueger —  Wedding Guest
 John Marquette —  Wise Man
 Jeff Min —  Malacoda
 Leah Rose Orleans —  Harlequin Lamp
 Tom Porter —  Wise Man
 Moneca S. Reid —  Wedding Guest
 Danny Rhodes —  Cagnazzo
 James Tellier —  Sailor (as Karina's Father)
 Bob Weagant —  B (as Head Wise Man)
 Jonathan Weir —  Rubicante
 Ted Williams —  Carriage Driver

External links
 
 
 Wilschke, Amy: DUST TO DUST: Two-Feature Project Comes Full Circle, Screen Magazine

2007 films
Films shot in Illinois
Films shot in Chicago
American avant-garde and experimental films
2000s avant-garde and experimental films
2000s English-language films
2000s American films